Sonia Citron (born October 22, 2003) is an American college basketball player for the Notre Dame Fighting Irish of the Atlantic Coast Conference (ACC).

Early life and high school career
Citron was born in White Plains, New York to Yolanda and William Citron. Her father played college basketball for Bradley, and her brother, Will, has played college soccer for Cornell and Virginia. She grew up playing soccer and began focusing on basketball in eighth grade, modeling her game after Sabrina Ionescu. Citron played basketball for The Ursuline School in New Rochelle, New York. As a junior, she averaged 23.8 points, 10.6 rebounds, 4.3 steals and 3.1 assists per game, and was named New York Gatorade Player of the Year, New York State Sportswriters Association Class AA Player of the Year and The Journal News Westchester/Putnam Player of the Year. She led Ursuline to the Section 1 Class AA title and a 24–0 record, before the state tournament was canceled due to the COVID-19 pandemic. 

In her senior season, Citron averaged 26.3 points, 11.2 rebounds, five assists and three steals per game, leading Ursuline to the Southern Westchester Group 1 championship and a 14–0 record. She was named Miss New York Basketball as the top player in the state, while repeating as New York Gatorade Player of the Year and Westchester/Putnam Player of the Year. Citron was selected to the rosters for the McDonald's All-American Game and Jordan Brand Classic. Rated a four-star recruit and one of the top guards in her class by ESPN, she committed to play college basketball for Notre Dame over offers from Oregon, Stanford and Ohio State, among others.

College career
On December 2, 2021, Citron scored a career-high 29 points in a 76–71 win over Michigan State. As a freshman, she averaged 11.8 points and 6.6 rebounds per game, earning Atlantic Coast Conference (ACC) Rookie of the Year. She was a six-time ACC Freshman of the Week, matching the program record held by Brianna Turner.

National team career
Citron won a gold medal with the United States at the 2019 FIBA Under-16 Women's Americas Championship in Chile. She was named to the all-tournament team after averaging 13.3 points per game, second on her team. Citron helped the United States win another gold medal at the 2021 FIBA Under-19 Women's Basketball World Cup in Hungary. She averaged 13.7 points, 7.3 rebounds and 2.9 assists per game, earning all-tournament team honors.

References

External links
Notre Dame Fighting Irish bio
USA Basketball profile

2003 births
Living people
American women's basketball players
Basketball players from New York (state)
Notre Dame Fighting Irish women's basketball players
Guards (basketball)
McDonald's High School All-Americans
People from White Plains, New York